Khryapnik is a rural locality (a khutor) in Maritsky Selsoviet Rural Settlement, Lgovsky District, Kursk Oblast, Russia. Population:

Geography 
The khutor is located in the Prutishche River basin (in the basin of the Seym), 63.5 km from the Russia–Ukraine border, 61 km north-west of Kursk, 15 km north-east of the district center – the town Lgov, 5.5 km from the selsoviet center – Maritsa.

 Climate
Khryapnik has a warm-summer humid continental climate (Dfb in the Köppen climate classification).

Transport 
Khryapnik is located 17.5 km from the road of regional importance  (Kursk – Lgov – Rylsk – border with Ukraine) as part of the European route E38, 5.5 km from the road  (Lgov – Konyshyovka), 16.5 km from the road of intermunicipal significance  (38K-017 – Nikolayevka – Shirkovo), 3 km from the road  (38K-023 – Olshanka – Marmyzhi – 38N-362), on the road  (38N-437 – Krasnaya Dubrava), 1.5 km from the nearest railway halt 565 km (railway line Navlya – Lgov-Kiyevsky).

The rural locality is situated 66.5 km from Kursk Vostochny Airport, 153 km from Belgorod International Airport and 270 km from Voronezh Peter the Great Airport.

References

Notes

Sources

Rural localities in Lgovsky District